Jack Horner may refer to:

"Little Jack Horner", a nursery rhyme

People

Jack Horner (activist) (born 1922), Australian author and activist in the Aboriginal-Australian Fellowship
Jack Horner (baseball) (1863–1910), American professional baseball player
Jack Horner (journalist) (1912–2005), Gordon John Horner, Minnesota sportscaster
Jack Horner (paleontologist) (born 1946), American paleontologist
Jack Horner (politician) (1927–2004), John Henry Horner known as "Jack" or "Cactus Jack", member of the Canadian House of Commons
Jack B. Horner (1922–2009), Pennsylvania politician

Fictional characters
 "Big" Jack Horner, a character from the 2022 film Puss in Boots: The Last Wish

Jack Horner, the fictional porn director in the 1997 film Boogie Nights 
Jack Horner (comics), a character from the comic book, Fables, created by Bill Willingham, based on the nursery rhyme character
 Little Jack Horner, the protagonist of the nursery rhyme "Little Jack Horner"

Animals 
Jack Horner (racehorse) (born 1917), 1926 Grand National winning horse

See also

John Horner (disambiguation)
Horner (disambiguation)